Women's Rights is the second studio album by Seattle rock band Childbirth. It was recorded at Vault Studio and featured each of the band's members, Bree McKenna (also of the band Tacocat), Stacy Peck (also of the band Pony Time), and Julia Shaprio (also of the band Chastity Belt). The album was released on October 2, 2015 by Suicide Squeeze Records.

Critical reception 

Women's Rights is noted by critics for its "feminist" tones. Several songs are noted as "silly," "funny," and "comedy[ic]." Bitch Media writer Bobby Moore claimed that songs from the album such as Tech Bro and Siri, Open Tinder "take aim at less-than-desirable men," and NPR reviewer Katie Presley cites the album's hits as addressing a "typically unsung set of freedoms vital to an equitable female experience."

Track listing

Personnel 

 Bass, vocals – Bree McKenna
 Drums – Stacy Peck
 Artwork, guitar, vocals – Julia Shapiro
 Engineer – Ian Lesage
 Mixing – Alice Wilder
 Mixing – Chris Hanzsek

References

External links

2015 albums
Childbirth (band) albums